The House Committee (Malay: Jawatankuasa Dewan; ; Tamil: ஹவுஸ் ஆஃப் லார்ட்ஸ் ஹவுஸ் கமிட்டி) is a select committee of the Senate in the Parliament of Malaysia that set policy and provided guidance for long-term planning for the House, supervised its finances, and supervised the scheme for members' expenses.

Membership

14th Parliament
As of April 2019, the members of the committee are as follows:

See also
Parliamentary Committees of Malaysia

References

External links
HOUSE COMMITTEE - SENATE

Parliament of Malaysia
Committees of the Parliament of Malaysia
Committees of the Dewan Negara